The Vilayet of Manastir was a first-level administrative division (vilayet) of the Ottoman Empire, created in 1874, dissolved in 1877 and re-established in 1879. The vilayet was occupied during the First Balkan War in 1912 and divided between the Kingdom of Greece and the Kingdom of Serbia, with some parts later becoming part of the newly established Principality of Albania.

Administrative divisions

Initially the Manastir Vilayet had the following sanjaks:
 Sanjak of Manastir
 Sanjak of Prizren
 Sanjak of Dibra
 Sanjak of Scutari

After administrative reforms in 1867 and 1877 some parts of the Manastir Vilayet were ceded to newly established Scutari Vilayet (1867) and Kosovo Vilayet (1877).

Administrative divisions of Manastir Vilayet until 1912:
 Sanjak of Manastir: Kazas of Manastir (Bitola), Pirlepe (Prilep), Florina, Kıraçova (Kičevo) and Ohrid.
 Sanjak of Serfiğe (Between 1864-1867 and 1873–1892): Kazas of Serfiçe (modern Servia), Kozana (modern Kozani), Alasonya (modern Elasson), Kayalar (Ptolemaida), Nasliç (modern Neapolis, Kozani) and Grebne (modern Grevena).
 Sanjak of Dibra: Kazas of Debre-i Bala (Debar), Mat, Debre-i Zir (Its center was Piskopoya), Rakalar (region around river Radika (its local name is River region.
 Sanjak of Elbasan (İlbasan): Kazas of İlbasan, Grameç and Peklin.
 Sanjak of Görice: Kazas of Görice (Korçë), İstarova (Pogradec), Kolonya (Erseke) (Its center was Ersek) and Kesriye (Kastoria).

Demographics

1897
According to Russian consul in the Manastir Vilayet, A. Rostkovski, finishing the statistical article in 1897, the total population was 803,340, with Rostkovski grouping the population into the following groups:

Turks, Ottomans: 78,867
Albanians, Ghegs: 144,918
Albanians, Tosks: 81,518
Albanians, Christians: 35,525
Slavs, Exarchists: 186,656
Slavs, Patriarchists: 93,694
Slavs, Muslims: 11,542
Greeks, Christians: 97,439
Greeks, Muslims: 10,584
Vlachs (Aromanians): 53,227
Jews: 5,270

1906/07
According to the 1906/07 Ottoman census the vilayet had a total population of 824,828 people, ethnically consisting as:
Muslims - 328,551
Christian Greeks - 286,001
Christian Bulgarians - 197,088
Wallachians - 5,556
Jews - 5,459
Gypsies - 2,104
Armenians - 8
Protestants - 5
Latins - 3
Foreign citizens - 53

1912
According to an estimation published in a Belgian magazine, the ethnic composition in 1912 when the vilayet was dissolved during the First Balkan War was:
Orthodox Bulgarians - 331,000
Muslim Albanians - 219,000
Orthodox Vlachs - 65,500
Orthodox Greeks - 62,000
Muslim Bulgarians - 24,000
Muslim Turks - 11,500
 mixed - 35,000

References

External links
 

 
Vilayets of the Ottoman Empire in Europe
States and territories disestablished in 1912
Macedonia under the Ottoman Empire
1874 establishments in the Ottoman Empire
History of Bitola
1912 disestablishments in the Ottoman Empire